Indus College of Engineering was established in the year 2007.

References

Educational institutions established in 2007
2007 establishments in Orissa